Richard John Denison, 9th Baron Londesborough (born 2 July 1959), is a British hereditary peer and crossbench member of the House of Lords.

Lord Londesborough took his seat and gave his maiden speech in the House of Lords in 1999, just before being excluded by the House of Lords Act 1999. He became a member of the Lords again in June 2021, being elected by the whole House in a by-election following the retirement of the Countess of Mar. He took the oath on 1 July 2021. Nearly 22 years after, Lord Londesborough spoke again in the Lords, touching on his first maiden speech and foreign aid on 27 October 2021.

References

1959 births
Living people
Barons in the Peerage of the United Kingdom
Crossbench hereditary peers
Richard
Londesborough
Londesborough